Sergei Nikolayevich Ivanov (born 30 May 1980) is a Kyrgyzstani former international footballer.

Career
During his career, Ivanov played for Dinamo Bishkek and SKA-PVO Bishkek in his native Kyrgyzstan, Anzhi Makhachkala in Russia, and FC Kairat, FC Ekibastuzets, FC Taraz and FC Irtysh in Kazakhstan.

Ivanov also represented Kyrgyzstan between 1997 and 2001.

Career statistics

Club

International

Statistics accurate as of 9 September 2014

International goals

|-
| 1. || 13 June 1997 || Azadi Stadium, Tehran, Iran ||  || 5–0 || 6–0 || 1998 FIFA WCQ
|}

Honours

Club
Dinamo Bishkek
 Kyrgyzstan League (3): 1997, 1998, 1999

References

External links

Player profile at FC Irtysh official website

1980 births
Living people
Kyrgyzstani footballers
Kyrgyzstan international footballers
Kyrgyzstani expatriate footballers
Expatriate footballers in Kazakhstan
FC Alga Bishkek players
FC Anzhi Makhachkala players
FC Dinamo Bishkek players
FC Kairat players
FC Irtysh Pavlodar players
FC Taraz players
Kyrgyzstani expatriate sportspeople in Kazakhstan
Expatriate footballers in Russia
Russian Premier League players
Kazakhstan Premier League players
Kyrgyzstani people of Russian descent
Association football forwards
Association football midfielders